Arthur "Joe" Murdoch (30 October 1908 – 26 December 2002) was an Australian rules footballer who played in the VFL in between 1927 and 1936 for the Richmond Football Club.

Murdoch was an exceptionally tough defender who was at the forefront of an exceptional backline that held the formidable South Melbourne and Collingwood attacks numerous times in important matches during the 1930s. For his size, Murdoch had exceptionally good ground skills and would always use his strength to his advantage when the ball was loose.

He was capable of playing in any position on the backline, for most of his career fitting in as required to accommodate other defenders such as Maurie Sheahan, Martin Bolger and Basil McCormack. He played in the losing 1928 Grand Final side and in the 1932 premiership side as a centre-half-back, whilst in the losing 1929 side Murdoch was on the half-back flank and in 1931 full-back. By the time of the 1934 premiership side Richmond were so well-equipped with top defenders that Murdoch was moved to the forward line where he kicked a goal - despite having between Rounds Nine and Fourteen of that season held the VFL record for most games without kicking a goal.

Murdoch's career ended in sensational fashion when in 1936 he was involved in a fight with Collingwood legend Gordon Coventry. Though Coventry was judged the instigator of the conflict, Murdoch was on Tuesday 4 August found guilty of retaliating and suspended for four matches. Though he played one more game, Richmond did not re-engage him for 1937.

References 
Citations

Bibliography
 Hogan P: The Tigers Of Old, Richmond FC, Melbourne 1996

1908 births
2002 deaths
Richmond Football Club players
Richmond Football Club Premiership players
Glenelg Football Club players
Australian rules footballers from Victoria (Australia)
Two-time VFL/AFL Premiership players